Jam Kandorna is a village located in the Jamkandorna tehsil of the Rajkot district in Gujarat, India. Jam Kandorna is 73.6 km from the sub-district headquarters in Jamkandorna.

Demographics

Source:

References

Villages in Rajkot district